Varadin Bridge is a bridge on the Danube river in Novi Sad, Serbia. The bridge was built in 2000, after the previous bridge (Marshal Tito Bridge, renamed Varadin Bridge in 1991) at this location was destroyed during NATO bombardment on 1 April 1999.

See also
 List of bridges in Serbia
 List of crossings of the Danube

References

External links

 Varadin Bridge at structurae.net

Bridges in Novi Sad
Buildings and structures in Novi Sad
Bridges completed in 2000
Bridges over the Danube
Rebuilt buildings and structures in Serbia